Canaima Airport is an airport in Canaima, a town in Canaima National Park in the state of Bolívar in Venezuela.

Airlines and destinations

Accidents and incidents
 On 27 August 1972, Douglas C-47 YV-C-AKE of LAV suffered a failure of the port engine shortly after take-off on a domestic scheduled passenger flight to Tomás de Heres Airport, Ciudad Bolivar. The aircraft crashed while attempting to return to Canaima, killing all 34 people on board.
On 2 October 1998, Douglas DC-3C YV-611C of Servivensa crashed on approach to Canaima Airport. The aircraft had been on a local sightseeing flight to view the Angel Falls. One of the 25 people on board was killed.

See also
Transport in Venezuela
List of airports in Venezuela

References

External links
OurAirports - Canaima
SkyVector - Canaima
OpenStreetMap - Canaima

Video from aircraft landing at Canaima Airport

Airports in Venezuela
Buildings and structures in Bolívar (state)